The Secretary of Veterans and Defense Affairs is a member of the Virginia Governor's Cabinet. It was created by Governor Bob McDonnell in 2010 to succeed the position of the Assistant to the Governor for Commonwealth Preparedness. It was referred to as the "Secretary of Veterans Affairs and Homeland Security" until 2014, when most homeland security responsibilities were transferred over to the Virginia Secretary of Public Safety and Homeland Security. The office was most recently held by Carlos Hopkins, who succeeded retired Admiral John C. Harvey Jr. in 2017. Craig Crenshaw has been nominated to serve as Secretary of Veterans Affairs.

List of Secretaries of Veterans Affairs
Prior to the establishment of the Secretariat of Veterans Affairs and Homeland Security, there existed an Assistant to the Governor, which itself emerged from Governor Jim Gilmore's Virginia Preparedness and Security Panel created after the September 11th terrorist attacks.

References

2010 establishments in Virginia
Government agencies established in 2010
Veterans Affairs
Veterans Affairs